Harris Hancock (May 14, 1867 – March 19, 1944) was a mathematics professor at the University of Cincinnati who worked on algebraic number theory and related areas. He was the brother of the horse breeder Arthur B. Hancock.

Biography
Harris Hancock was born at his family's estate, Ellerslie, in Albemarle County, Virginia on May 14, 1867. He graduated from the University of Virginia's school of mathematics in 1886. He received an AB from Johns Hopkins University in 1888, an AM and PhD from the University of Berlin in 1894, and an ScD from the University of Paris in 1901.

He married Belle Lyman Clay on September 30, 1907, and they had two children.

Harris Hancock died at Ellerslie on March 19, 1944.

Publications

Articles

Books

  Reprinted by Dover Publications, Inc., New York 1958
  Reprinted by Dover Publications, Inc., New York 1958
 Reprinted by Dover Publications, Inc., New York 1960 
 Reprinted by Dover Publications, Inc., New York 1964 
 Reprinted by Dover Publications, Inc., New York 1964, 2005

References

External links
Harris Hancock

1867 births
1944 deaths
Hancock family
20th-century American mathematicians
University of Cincinnati people